Jon Gorenc Stanković (born 14 January 1996) is a Slovenian footballer who plays as a defensive midfielder for the Austrian Football Bundesliga side Sturm Graz and the Slovenia national team.

Club career

Huddersfield Town
Stanković made his debut for Huddersfield Town in an EFL Cup tie with Shrewsbury Town on 9 August 2016. He made his league debut as a late substitute against Rotherham United on 27 September 2016. He scored his first goal for Huddersfield Town on 19 August 2018 in a 6–1 defeat to Manchester City.

Sturm Graz
On 29 June 2020, Stanković signed a three-year contract with the Austrian Football Bundesliga side Sturm Graz, though he remained at Huddersfield for the remainder of the season, extended due to the COVID-19 pandemic, having signed a short-term extension.

International career
Stanković was called-up to the senior Slovenia squad by Srečko Katanec for a friendly against Turkey in June 2016.

Four years after he was first invited to the national team, he made his first appearance in the friendly match against San Marino on 7 October 2020.

Career statistics

Club

International
Scores and results list Slovenia's goal tally first, score column indicates score after each Stanković goal.

References

External links
NZS profile 

1996 births
Living people
Footballers from Ljubljana
Slovenian footballers
Slovenia youth international footballers
Slovenia under-21 international footballers
Slovenia international footballers
Association football defenders
Association football midfielders
NK Domžale players
Slovenian expatriate footballers
Slovenian expatriate sportspeople in Germany
Expatriate footballers in Germany
Borussia Dortmund II players
Huddersfield Town A.F.C. players
SK Sturm Graz players
Slovenian expatriate sportspeople in England
Expatriate footballers in England
Slovenian expatriate sportspeople in Austria
Expatriate footballers in Austria
Slovenian PrvaLiga players
3. Liga players
Regionalliga players
English Football League players
Premier League players
Austrian Football Bundesliga players